The following is a list of significant lead guitarists, arranged in ascending alphabetical order of their last name. For rhythm guitarists see list of rhythm guitarists.

A

 Tosin Abasi (Animals As Leaders)
 "Dimebag" Darrell Abbott (Pantera, Damageplan, Rebel Meets Rebel)
 John Abercrombie
 Ryan Adams (The Cardinals)
 Marcus Adoro (Eraserheads)
 Mikael Åkerfeldt (Opeth)
 Fredrik Åkesson (Arch Enemy, Opeth)
 Jan Akkerman (Focus)
 Doug Aldrich (Whitesnake, Dio)
 Johnny Alegre
 Art Alexakis (Everclear)
 Joey Allen (Warrant)
 Paul Allender (Cradle of Filth)
 Duane Allman (The Allman Brothers Band)
 Lee Altus (Exodus, Heathen)
 Dave Amato (REO Speedwagon)
 Christopher Amott (Arch Enemy, Armageddon, Dark Tranquillity)
 Michael Amott (Arch Enemy, Carcass)
 Trey Anastasio (Phish)
 Al Anderson (Bob Marley and the Wailers)
 Emma Anderson (Lush)
 Rusty Anderson (Paul McCartney)
 Apostolis Anthimos (SBB)
 Daniel Antonsson (Dimension Zero, Soilwork)
 Redouane Aouameur
 Billie Joe Armstrong (Green Day, Pinhead Gunpowder)
 Tim Armstrong (Operation Ivy, Transplants, Rancid)
 Rob Arnold (Chimaira)
 DJ Ashba (Sixx:A.M., Guns N' Roses)
 Ron Asheton (The Stooges)
 Chet Atkins
 Berton Averre (The Knack)

B

 Ayub Bachchu  (Love Runs Blind)
 Randy Bachman (The Guess Who, Bachman–Turner Overdrive)
 Dave Bainbridge (Iona)
 Dave Baksh (Sum 41, Brown Brigade)
 Russ Ballard (Argent)
 Terry Balsamo (Evanescence)
 Perry Bamonte (The Cure)
 Peter Banks (Yes, Flash)
 Carl Barat (The Libertines, Dirty Pretty Things)
 Marcelo Barbosa (Angra)
 Martin Barre (Jethro Tull)
 Syd Barrett (Pink Floyd)
 Steve Bartek (Oingo Boingo)
 Michael Angelo Batio
 Reb Beach   (Winger, Dokken, Whitesnake)
 Norman Beaker
 Corey Beaulieu (Trivium)
 Jan Bechtum
 Jeff Beck (The Yardbirds, Jeff Beck Group, Beck, Bogert & Appice)
 Jason Becker (David Lee Roth, Cacophony)
 Franny Beecher (Bill Haley & His Comets)
 Adrian Belew
 Andy Bell (Ride, Hurricane #1, Oasis, Beady Eye)
 Carl Bell (Fuel)
 Eric Bell (Thin Lizzy)
 Matthew Bellamy (Muse)
 George Benson
 Chuck Berry
 Nuno Bettencourt (Extreme, Rihanna)
 Dickey Betts (The Allman Brothers Band)
 Jason Bieler (Saigon Kick)
 Simon Binks (Australian Crawl)
 Jón Þór Birgisson (Sigur Rós)
 Anders Björler (At the Gates, The Haunted)
 Frank Blackfire (Kreator, Sodom)
 Ritchie Blackmore (Deep Purple, Rainbow, Blackmore's Night)
 Doug Blair (W.A.S.P.)
 Nate Blasdell (I Set My Friends on Fire)
 Mike Bloomfield
 Marc Bolan (T. Rex)
 Tommy Bolin (Zephyr, The James Gang, Deep Purple)
 Joe Bonamassa
 D. Boon (Minutemen)
 Wes Borland  (Limp Bizkit, Black Light Burns)
 Johnny Borrell  (Razorlight)
 Carlton Bost (Orgy)
 Tony Bourge (Budgie)
 Mick Box (Uriah Heep)
 James Dean Bradfield (Manic Street Preachers)
 Tony Bradley (The Distillers, Spinnerette)
 Vito Bratta (White Lion)
 Creed Bratton (The Grass Roots)
 Chris Broderick (Megadeth, Nevermore, Jag Panzer)
 Devin Bronson
 Joel Bogen (Toyah)
 Carrie Brownstein (Sleater-Kinney)
 Ben Bruce (Asking Alexandria)
 Roy Buchanan
 Peter Buck (R.E.M.)
 Rob Buck (10,000 Maniacs)
 Buckethead (Praxis, Guns N' Roses, C2B3)
 Lindsey Buckingham (Fleetwood Mac)
 Jonny Buckland (Coldplay)
 Bumblefoot (Guns N' Roses)
 Vinny Burns (Ten)
 James Burton
 John Butler (The John Butler Trio)
 Glen Buxton (Alice Cooper)
 Roddy Byers (The Specials)

C

 Ernie C (Body Count)
 Charlotte Caffey (The Go-Go's)
 Randy California (Spirit)
 Toy Caldwell (The Marshall Tucker Band),
 Mike Campbell (Tom Petty and the Heartbreakers)
 Phil Campbell (Motörhead)
 Vivian Campbell (Dio, Whitesnake, Def Leppard)
 Mike Campese
 Jerry Cantrell (Alice in Chains)
 Captain Sensible (The Damned)
 Chris Carrabba (Dashboard Confessional)
 Perfecto de Castro (Rivermaya)
 Carlos Cavazo (Quiet Riot)
 Danny Cedrone (Bill Haley & His Comets)
 Gustavo Cerati (Soda Stereo)
 Nic Cester (Jet)
 Ross Childress (Collective Soul)
 Charlie Christian
 John Cipollina (Quicksilver Messenger Service, The Dinosaurs)
 Eric Clapton (The Yardbirds, Cream, Derek and the Dominos)
 Gary Clark Jr.
 Steve Clark (Def Leppard)
 "Fast" Eddie Clarke (Motörhead)
 Dave "Clem" Clempson (Colosseum, Humble Pie)
 Michael Clifford (5 Seconds of Summer)
 Nels Cline (Nels Cline Trio, The Nels Cline Singers, Banyan, Wilco)
 Kurt Cobain (Nirvana)
 Phil Collen (Def Leppard)
 Albert Collins
 Allen Collins (Lynyrd Skynyrd)
 Nathan Connolly (Snow Patrol)
 Ry Cooder
 Kyle Cook (Matchbox Twenty)
 Rusty Cooley
 John Corabi (Ratt)
 Lanny Cordola (Giuffria, House of Lords, Magdalen)
 Billy Corgan (The Smashing Pumpkins)
 Hugh Cornwell (The Stranglers)
 Graham Coxon (Blur)
 Robert Cray
 Paul Crook (Anthrax, Sebastian Bach, Meat Loaf, Marya Roxx)
 Steve Cropper (Booker T. & the M.G.'s)
 Robbin Crosby (Ratt)
 Rivers Cuomo (Weezer)
 Marcos Curiel (P.O.D.)

D

 Denis D'Amour (Voivod)
 Dick Dale
 Brody Dalle (The Distillers, Spinnerette)
 Adam "Nergal" Darski (Behemoth)
 Dave Davies (The Kinks)
 Mahyar Dean (Angband)
 Paul Dean (Loverboy)
 Gene Deer
 Chris DeGarmo (Queensrÿche)
 Isaac Delahaye (Epica)
 Tiago Della Vega
 Dean DeLeo (Stone Temple Pilots)
 Tom DeLonge (Blink-182, Box Car Racer, Angels & Airwaves)
 Brad Delson (Linkin Park)
 Warren DeMartini (Ratt)
 Leonard Dembo
 Phil Demmel (Machine Head)
 Britt "Lightning" Denaro (Vixen)
 Rick Derringer (The McCoys, Edgar Winter, Johnny Winter)
 C.C. DeVille (Poison)
 Don Devore (Amazing Baby)
 Buck Dharma (Blue Öyster Cult)
 Al Di Meola (Go)
 Bo Diddley
 Carl Dixon
 Ian D'Sa  (Billy Talent)
 Dave Dobbyn (Th' Dudes, DD Smash)
 Joe Dolce  
 Dan Donegan (Disturbed)
 Abbath Doom Occulta (Immortal, I)
 Dr. Know (Bad Brains)
 Ol Drake (Evile)
 Jake Dreyer (Iced Earth)
 Oscar Dronjak (Ceremonial Oath)
 Glen Drover (King Diamond, Megadeth, Eidolon)
 Billy Duffy (The Cult)
 Jeff "Mantas" Dunn (Venom)
 Bob Dylan
 Teddy Diaz (The Dawn)

E

 Ronnie Earl
 Elliot Easton (The Cars)
 Duane Eddy
 The Edge (U2)
 Lu Edmonds (Public Image Limited)
 Nokie Edwards (The Ventures)
 Mike Einziger (Incubus)
 Tripp Eisen (Dope, Static-X)
 Stefan Elmgren (HammerFall)
 Matt Embree (The Sound Of Animals Fighting, Rx Bandits)
 Tommy Emmanuel
 Rik Emmett (Triumph)
 Niklas Engelin
 Thomas Erak (The Fall Of Troy)
 Eric Erlandson (Hole, RRIICCEE)
 Kevin Eubanks (The Tonight Show Band)

F

 Mark Farner (Grand Funk Railroad)
 Tim Farriss (INXS)
 Josh Farro (Paramore)
 Don Felder (The Eagles)
 Neil Finn (Split Enz, Crowded House, Finn Brothers)
 Roger Fisher (Heart)
 Vic Flick (John Barry Seven)
 John Fogerty (Creedence Clearwater Revival)
 Lita Ford (The Runaways)
 Jon Foreman (Switchfoot)
 Dave Fortman (Ugly Kid Joe)
 Peter Frampton (Humble Pie)
 Bruce Franklin (Trouble)
 Lars Frederiksen (Rancid)
 Ace Frehley (Kiss)
 Glenn Frey  (The Eagles)
 Marty Friedman (Megadeth, Cacophony)
 Robert Fripp (King Crimson)
 Fred Frith
 Bill Frisell
 John Frusciante (Red Hot Chili Peppers)
 Vim Fuego (Bad News)
 Koichi Fukuda (Static-X)
 Jim Fuller (Surfaris)

G

 Gus G. (Dream Evil, Firewind, Nightrage, Ozzy Osbourne)
 Steve Gaines (Lynyrd Skynyrd)
 Galder (Dimmu Borgir)
 Noel Gallagher (Oasis)
 Rory Gallagher
 Anthony Gallo (Suicidal Tendencies)
 Cliff Gallup
 Frank Gambale (Chick Corea Elektric Band)
 Jerry Garcia (Grateful Dead)
 Roopam Garg
 Kyle Gass (Tenacious D)
 Synyster Gates (Avenged Sevenfold, Pinkly Smooth)
 Björn Gelotte (In Flames)
 Rocky George (Cro-Mags, Suicidal Tendencies)
 Janick Gers (Iron Maiden)
 Sascha Gerstner (Helloween, ex-Freedom Call)
 Billy Gibbons (ZZ Top)
 Chad Gilbert  (New Found Glory)
 Paul Gilbert (Racer X, Mr. Big)
 Vince Gill
 Brad Gillis (Night Ranger, Ozzy Osbourne)
 David Gilmour (Pink Floyd)
 Greg Ginn (Black Flag)
 Hamish Glencross (My Dying Bride)
 Craig Goldy (Giuffria, Dio, Rough Cutt)
 Matt Good (From First to Last)
 Myles Goodwyn (April Wine)
 Pier Gonella (Mastercastle-Necrodeath)
 Scott Gorham (Thin Lizzy, 21 Guns)
 The Great Kat
 Gary Green (Gentle Giant)
 Grant Green
 Peter Green (Fleetwood Mac)
 Brian Greenway (April Wine, Mashmakhan)
 Jonny Greenwood (Radiohead,  The Smile)
 Luther Grosvenor (Spooky Tooth, Mott the Hoople)
 Tracii Guns (L.A. Guns, Brides of Destruction, Contraband)
 Buddy Guy

H

 Steve Hackett (Genesis)
 Merle Haggard
 Danielle Haim (Haim)
 Ollie Halsall (Patto, Tempest)
 Kirk Hammett (Exodus, Metallica)
 Albert Hammond, Jr. (The Strokes)
 Jeff Hanneman (Slayer)
 Kai Hansen (Helloween, Gamma Ray)
 Blake Harnage (VersaEmerge)
 George Harrison (The Beatles, Traveling Wilburys)
 PJ Harvey
 Juliana Hatfield
 Dan Hawkins (The Darkness, Stone Gods)
 Justin Hawkins (The Darkness)
 Pete Haycock (Climax Blues Band)
 Warren Haynes (The Allman Brothers Band, Gov't Mule)
 Justin Hayward (The Moody Blues)
 Eddie Hazel (Parliament-Funkadelic)
 Jeff Healey
 Helmuth
 Jimi Hendrix
 Leon Hendrix
 Jimmy Herring (Widespread Panic)
 Greg Hetson (Circle Jerks, Bad Religion)
 Tony Hicks  (The Hollies)
 hide (X Japan)
 Dave Hill (Slade)
 Brent Hinds (Mastodon)
 Hisashi (Glay)
 Hizaki (Versailles, Jupiter)
 Terrance Hobbs (Suffocation)
 Gary Hoey
 Wolf Hoffmann (Accept)
 Randy Holden
 Allan Holdsworth
 Buddy Holly
 Esa Holopainen (Amorphis)
 Gary Holt (Exodus)
 Jason Hook (Five Finger Death Punch)
 John Lee Hooker
 Matt Hoopes (Relient K)
 Jerry Horton (Papa Roach)
 Tomoyasu Hotei (Boøwy, Complex)
 Jimmy Hotz
 Rowland S. Howard
 Steve Howe (Yes, Asia)
 Bill Hudson (Cellador, Power Quest)
 Jon Hume (Evermore)
 Charlie Hunter

I

 Chris Impellitteri
 Tony Iommi (Black Sabbath, Heaven & Hell)
 Ernie Isley (The Isley Brothers)
 Poison Ivy (The Cramps)
 Izzy Stradlin (Guns N' Roses)
 Kenneth Ilagan (The Dawn)

J
 Matthias Jabs (Scorpions)
 Ramon Jacinto
 Tito Jackson (The Jackson 5)
 Jakko M. Jakszyk
 Colin James
 Ron Jarzombek (Watchtower, Spastic Ink, Blotted Science)
 John 5
 Bob Johnson (Steeleye Span)
 Eric Johnson
 Kelly Johnson (Girlschool)
 Lonnie Johnson
 Wilko Johnson (Dr Feelgood)
 Ruud Jolie (Within Temptation)
 Kevin Jonas (Jonas Brothers)
 Adam Jones (Tool)
 Brian Jones (The Rolling Stones)
 Danny Jones (McFly)
 Mick Jones (The Clash)
 Mick Jones (Foreigner, Spooky Tooth)
 Steve Jones (Sex Pistols)
 Stanley Jordan
 Tyler Joseph (Twenty One Pilots)

K

 Kapil Srivastava
 Alex Kapranos (Franz Ferdinand)
 Ben Kasica (Skillet)
 Terry Kath (Chicago)
 Jorma Kaukonen (Jefferson Airplane, Hot Tuna)
 Ryo Kawakita (Maximum The Hormone)
 Lenny Kaye (Patti Smith Group)
 Phil Keaggy (Glass Harp)
 Tom Keifer (Cinderella)
 Tim Kelly (Slaughter)
 Ken  (L'Arc-en-Ciel)
 Alan Kendall (The Bee Gees)
 Myles Kennedy (The Mayfield Four)
 Albert King
 B. B. King
 Ben King (The Yardbirds)
 Ed King (Lynyrd Skynyrd, Strawberry Alarm Clock)
 Kerry King (Slayer)
 Danny Kirwan (Fleetwood Mac)
 Andreas Kisser (Sepultura)
 Josh Klinghoffer (Red Hot Chili Peppers)
 Bob Klose  (Pink Floyd)
 Mark Knopfler (Dire Straits)
 Kaan Korad 
 Joel Kosche (Collective Soul)
 Paul Kossoff (Free)
 Richie Kotzen
 Ivan Kral
 Rocky Kramer
 Wayne Kramer (MC5)
 Robby Krieger (The Doors)
 Richard Kruspe (Rammstein)
 Tad Kubler
 Jan Kuehnemund (Vixen)
 Bruce Kulick (Kiss)

L

 Bernie LaBarge (David Clayton-Thomas)
 Alexi Laiho (Children of Bodom, Bodom After Midnight)
 Greg Lake (Emerson Lake & Palmer, King Crimson)
 Larry LaLonde (Possessed, Primus)
 Sonny Landreth
 Shawn Lane
 Jonny Lang
 Andy LaRocque (King Diamond)
 Andrew Latimer (Camel)
 Ronni Le Tekrø (TNT)
 Bernie Leadon (The Eagles)
 Alvin Lee (Ten Years After)
 Jake E. Lee (Ozzy Osbourne, Badlands)
 Duke Levine
 Matty Lewis (Zebrahead)
 Herman Li  (DragonForce)
 Alex Lifeson (Rush)
 Jani Liimatainen (Sonata Arctica, Altaria)
 Peter Lindgren (Opeth)
 Rudy Linka
 Lori Linstruth
 James Litherland (Colosseum, Mogul Thrash)
 Kerry Livgren (Kansas)
 Glenn Ljungström (In Flames, HammerFall)
 Nils Lofgren (E Street Band)
 Karl Logan (Manowar)
 Jeff Loomis (Arch Enemy, Nevermore)
 César "Vampiro" López (Maná, Azul Violeta, Jaguares)
 Kiko Loureiro (Megadeth, Angra)
 Clint Lowery (Sevendust)
 Arjen Anthony Lucassen
 Paco de Lucía
 Jens Ludwig (Edguy)
 Steve Lukather (Toto)
 George Lynch (Dokken, Lynch Mob)
 Steve Lynch (Autograph)
 Jeff Lynne (Electric Light Orchestra)

M

 Tony MacAlpine
 Lonnie Mack
 Brian "Too Loud" MacLeod (Chilliwack, Headpins)
 Logan Mader (Once Human, Soulfly, Machine Head)
 Wolf Mail
 Daron Malakian (System of a Down, Scars on Broadway)
 Yngwie Malmsteen
 Christofer Malmström
 Misha Mansoor (Periphery) 
 Kee Marcello (Europe)
 Frank Marino (Mahogany Rush)
 Johnny Marr (The Smiths)
 Steve Marriott (Small Faces), (Humble Pie)
 Vince Martell (Vanilla Fudge)
 Billy Martin (Good Charlotte)
 Jim Martin (Faith No More)
 Hank Marvin (The Shadows)
 Junior Marvin (Bob Marley and The Wailers)
 J Mascis (Dinosaur Jr)
 Hideto Matsumoto (X Japan)
 Tak Matsumoto (B'z)
 Brian May (Queen)
 John Mayer (John Mayer Trio)
 Nick McCabe (The Verve)
 Andy McCoy (Hanoi Rocks)
 Mike McCready (Pearl Jam, Temple of the Dog, Mad Season)
 Jimmy McCulloch (Wings, Thunderclap Newman, Stone the Crows, Small Faces, The Dukes)
 Roger McGuinn (The Byrds)
 John McLaughlin (Mahavishnu Orchestra, Shakti)
 Richard McNamara (Embrace)
 Tony McPhee (The Groundhogs)
 Mickey Melchiondo aka Dean Ween (Ween)
 Michelle Meldrum (Phantom Blue, Meldrum)
 Barry Melton (Country Joe & The Fish)
 Vince Melouney (Billy Thorpe & the Aztecs, The Bee Gees)
 Dave Meniketti (Y&T)
 Jim Messina (Poco, Buffalo Springfield, Loggins and Messina)
 Naser Mestarihi
 Pat Metheny
 Phil Miller
 Steve Miller
 Brian Molko (Placebo)
 Wes Montgomery
 Ronnie Montrose (Montrose, Gamma)
 Ben Moody  (Evanescence)
 Gary Moore (Thin Lizzy)
 Thurston Moore (Sonic Youth)
 Vinnie Moore (UFO)
 Tom Morello (Rage Against the Machine, Audioslave)
 Sterling Morrison (The Velvet Underground)
 Steve Morse (Dixie Dregs, Steve Morse Band, Deep Purple)
 Ian Moss (Cold Chisel)
 Jason Moss (Cherry Poppin' Daddies)
 Bob Mothersbaugh (Devo)
 Cameron Muncey (Jet)
 Christian Münzner (Obscura)
 James Murphy (Obituary)
 Dave Murray (Iron Maiden)
 Dave Mustaine (Megadeth, Metallica)
 Zach Myers (Shinedown)
 Gary Myrick (Havana 3am)

N

 Dave Navarro (Jane's Addiction, Red Hot Chili Peppers)
 Mike Ness (Social Distortion)
 Craig Nicholls (The Vines)
 Rick Nielsen (Cheap Trick)
 Jon Nödtveidt (Dissection)
 John Nolan (Taking Back Sunday)
 Noodle (Gorillaz)
 Pontus Norgren (The Poodles, HammerFall)
 John Norum (Europe)
 Ted Nugent (Amboy Dukes, Damn Yankees)
 Anders Nyström (Katatonia, Bloodbath)

O

 Jus Oborn (Electric Wizard)
 Ed O'Brien (Radiohead)
 Pat O'Brien (Cannibal Corpse, Nevermore, Exhorder)
 Eddie Ojeda (Twisted Sister)
 Dave Odlum (The Frames)
 André Olbrich (Blind Guardian)
 Criss Oliva (Savatage)
 Juan Francisco Ordóñez
 Buzz Osborne (Melvins)

P

 Jimmy Page (Led Zeppelin, The Yardbirds, The Firm)
 Michael "Padge" Paget (Bullet for My Valentine)
 Clive Painter (Broken Dog, The 99 Call, Tram (band), The Real Tuesday Weld)
 Brad Paisley
 Orianthi Panagaris
 Mark Parry (The Manvils)
 Joe Pass
 Les Paul
 Michal Pavlíček 
 Axel Rudi Pell
 Tony Peluso (The Carpenters)
 Carl Perkins
 Luther Perkins (Johnny Cash)
 Joe Perry (Aerosmith, The Joe Perry Project)
 Vicki Peterson  (The Bangles)
 John Petrucci (Dream Theater, Liquid Tension Experiment)
 Anthony Phillips (Genesis)
 Matt Pike (Sleep, High on Fire)
 Jake Pitts (Black Veil Brides)
 Sergio Pizzorno (Kasabian)
 Dean Pleasants (Suicidal Tendencies)
 Chris Poland (Megadeth)
 Andy Powell (Wishbone Ash)
 Prince
 Rod Price (Foghat)
 Jade Puget (AFI)

R

 Roddy Radiation (The Specials)
 Mick Ralphs (Bad Company, Mott the Hoople)
 Lee Ranaldo (Sonic Youth)
 Chris Rea
 Jerry Reed
 Lou Reed (The Velvet Underground)
 Vernon Reid (Living Colour)
 Django Reinhardt
 Arthur Rhames
 Randy Rhoads (Quiet Riot, Ozzy Osbourne)
 Keith Richards (The Rolling Stones)
 Gary Richrath (REO Speedwagon)
 Henjo Richter (Gamma Ray)
 Michael Ricketts
 Chris Risola (Steelheart)
 Marc Rizzo (Soulfly, Cavalera Conspiracy, Ill Niño)
 Jason Roberts (Norah Jones, Hymns (band), The Candles)
 Darrell Roberts (Five Finger Death Punch)
 Allison Robertson (The Donnas)
 Brian Robertson (Thin Lizzy, Motörhead)
 Robbie Robertson (The Band)
 Janet Robin
 Omar Rodríguez-López (At the Drive-In, Mars Volta)
 Tony Rombola (Godsmack, Another Animal)
 Michael Romeo (Symphony X)
 Mick Ronson (David Bowie)
 Joe Don Rooney (Rascal Flatts)
 Ryan Ross (Panic! at the Disco)
 Francis Rossi (Status Quo)
 Gary Rossington (Lynyrd Skynyrd)
 Uli Jon Roth (Scorpions)
 Steve Rothery (Marillion, The Wishing Tree)
 Erik Rutan (Ripping Corpse, Morbid Angel, Hate Eternal, Cannibal Corpse)
 Johnny Rzeznik (Goo Goo Dolls)
 Francis Reyes (The Dawn)

S

 Dave "The Snake" Sabo (Skid Row)
 Richie Sambora (Bon Jovi)
 Claudio Sanchez (Coheed and Cambria)
 Karl Sanders (Nile)
 Carlos Santana (Santana)
 Joey Santiago (Pixies)
 Ralph Santolla (Obituary, Deicide)
 Joe Satriani
 Matt Scannell (Vertical Horizon)
 Michael Schenker (Scorpions, UFO, Michael Schenker Group, Contraband)
 Tom Scholz (Boston)
 Neal Schon (Journey)
 Jeff Schroeder (The Smashing Pumpkins)
 Chuck Schuldiner (Death, Control Denied)
 John Scofield
 Andy Scott (Sweet)
 Keith Scott (Bryan Adams)
 Tim Scott
 Sek Loso (Loso)
 Darius Semaña (Parokya ni Edgar)
 Brian Setzer (The Stray Cats)
 Charlie Sexton (Charlie Sexton)
 James "Munky" Shaffer (Korn)
 Dave Sharman
 Todd Sharpville
 Sonny Sharrock
 Kenny Wayne Shepherd
 Kevin Shields (My Bloody Valentine)
 Chris Shiflett (Foo Fighters)
 George Shuffler (The Stanley Brothers)
 Charlie Simpson (Fightstar, Busted)
 Sami Sirviö (Kent)
 Matt Skiba (Alkaline Trio)
 Alex Skolnick (Testament, Savatage, Trans-Siberian Orchestra)
 Skwisgaar Skwigelf (Dethklok)
 Slash (Guns N' Roses, Velvet Revolver, Slash's Snakepit)
 Martin Slattery (The Mescaleros)
 Earl Slick
 Hillel Slovak (Red Hot Chili Peppers)
 Brendon Small (Dethklok)
 Adrian Smith (Iron Maiden)
 Fred "Sonic" Smith (MC-5)
 Robert Smith (The Cure)
 Bruce Springsteen (E Street Band)
 Billy Squier
 John Squire (The Stone Roses, The Seahorses)
 Mark St. John (Kiss)
 Bill Steer (Carcass)
 Leigh Stephens (Blue Cheer, Sister Ray)
 Steve Stevens (Billy Idol)
 Travis Stever (Coheed and Cambria)
 Gina Stile (Vixen)
 Stephen Stills (Buffalo Springfield, Crosby, Stills, Nash & Young)
 Barry Stock (Three Days Grace)
 Andrew Stockdale (Wolfmother)
 Nita Strauss  (The Iron Maidens, Femme Fatale)
 Patrick Stump (Fall Out Boy)
 Sugizo (Luna Sea, X Japan)
 Muhammed Suiçmez (Necrophagist)
 Frankie Sullivan (Survivor)
 Tim Sult (Clutch)
 Hubert Sumlin
 Andy Summers (The Police)
 Bernard Sumner (Joy Division, New Order)
 Niklas Sundin (Dark Tranquillity)
 Roman Surman (Wednesday 13, Murderdolls)
 John Sykes (Tygers of Pan Tang, Thin Lizzy, Whitesnake)
 Red Symons (Skyhooks)
 Syu (Galneryus, Animetal)

T

 Ty Tabor (King's X)
 Joey Tafolla
 Akira Takasaki (Loudness)
 Marv Tarplin (Smokey Robinson and The Miracles, Smokey Robinson)
 Andy Taylor (Duran Duran)
 Mick Taylor (John Mayall and the Bluesbreakers, The Rolling Stones)
 Bobby Tench (Streetwalkers, Hummingbird, Van Morrison, Topper Headon)
 Octave Octavian Teodorescu
 Thomas Thacker (Sum 41)
 Tommy Thayer (Black 'N' Blue, Kiss)
 Kim Thayil (Soundgarden)
 Hughie Thomasson (Outlaws)
 Mick Thomson (Slipknot)
 Porl Thompson (The Cure)
 Richard Thompson
 Fredrik Thordendal (Meshuggah)
 George Thorogood
 Johnny Thunders (New York Dolls, The Heartbreakers)
 Steve Tibbetts
 Andy Timmons (Danger Danger)
 Glenn Tipton (Judas Priest)
 Timo Tolkki (Stratovarius)
 Simon Tong (The Verve, The Shining, The Good, the Bad & the Queen)
 Ray Toro (My Chemical Romance)
 Sam Totman (DragonForce)
 Devin Townsend (Strapping Young Lad)
 Pete Townshend (The Who)
 Mark Tremonti (Alter Bridge, Creed)
 Greg Tribbett  (Mudvayne, Hellyeah)
 Joe Trohman (Fall Out Boy)
 Robin Trower (Procol Harum)
 Derek Trucks (The Allman Brothers Band, Tedeschi Trucks Band)
 Nigel Tufnel (Lenny and the Squigtones, Spinal Tap)
 Luca Turilli
 Alex Turner  (Arctic Monkeys)
 Erik Turner (Warrant)
 Steve Turner (Mudhoney)
 Ted Turner (Wishbone Ash)

U
 Keith Urban

V

 Steve Vai
 Nick Valensi (The Strokes)
 James Valentine (Maroon 5)
 Sergio Vallín (Maná)
 Eddie Van Halen (Van Halen)
 Troy Van  (Queens of the Stone Age)
 Steve Van Zandt (E Street Band)
 Adrian Vandenberg (Vandenberg, Whitesnake, Manic Eden)
 Jimmie Vaughan
 Stevie Ray Vaughan
 Suzanne Vega
 Tom Verlaine (Television)
 Jacky Vincent (Falling in Reverse)
 Vinnie Vincent (Kiss)
 Virus (Dope, Lords of Acid, Device)
 Doyle Wolfgang von Frankenstein (Misfits, Kryst The Conqueror, Gorgeous Frankenstein)
 Emppu Vuorinen (Nightwish)

W

 Paul Waggoner (Between the Buried and Me)
 Dick Wagner
 Butch Walker (SouthGang)
 Chris Walla (Death Cab for Cutie)
 Joe Walsh (James Gang, The Eagles)
 Rich Ward (Stuck Mojo, Fozzy)
 Steve Wariner
 Baz Warne (The Stranglers)
 Kevin "Noodles" Wasserman (The Offspring)
 Jeff Waters (Annihilator)
 Muddy Waters
 Jeff Watson (Night Ranger)
 Mike Wead (King Diamond)
 Woody Weatherman (Corrosion of Conformity)
 Chris Weber (Hollywood Rose, U.P.O.)
 Michael Weikath (Helloween)
 Carl Weingarten
 Ben Weinman (The Dillinger Escape Plan)
 Scott Weinrich (The Obsessed)
 Brian "Head" Welch (Korn)
 Paul Weller (The Jam, The Style Council)
 Allen West (Obituary)
 Leslie West (Mountain)
 Bob Weston (Fleetwood Mac)
 Emil Werstler (Chimaira, Dååth)
 Alex Westaway (Fightstar)
 Deryck Whibley (Sum 41)
 Andrew White (Kaiser Chiefs)
 Clarence White (The Kentucky Colonels, Nashville West, The Byrds)
 Jack White (The White Stripes, The Raconteurs)
 Jason White (Green Day, Foxboro Hot Tubs)
 John "Charlie" Whitney (Family, Streetwalkers)
 Snowy White (Thin Lizzy)
 Peter Wichers (Soilwork)
 Carl Wilson (The Beach Boys)
 Nancy Wilson (Heart)
 Ricky Wilson (The B-52's)
 Steven Wilson (Porcupine Tree)
 Michael Wilton (Queensrÿche)
 Johnny Winter
 Piotr "Peter" Wiwczarek (Vader)
 Ronnie Wood (The Faces, The Rolling Stones)
 Link Wray
 Zakk Wylde (Ozzy Osbourne, Black Label Society)

Y

 Sami Yli-Sirniö (Kreator)
 Angus Young (AC/DC)
 James Young (Styx)
 Jeff Young (Megadeth)
 Neil Young (Buffalo Springfield, Crosby, Stills, Nash & Young)
 Thomas Youngblood (Kamelot)

Z

 Dweezil Zappa
 Frank Zappa
 John Zwetsloot (The Haunted)

 
Lead guitarists